Paranerita polyxena is a moth of the subfamily Arctiinae. It was described by Herbert Druce in 1883. It is found in Peru, Ecuador and Bolivia.

Subspecies
Paranerita polyxena polyxena (Peru, Ecuador)
Paranerita polyxena bolivica Strand, 1919 (Bolivia)

References

Paranerita
Moths described in 1883